Varama (Barama) is a Bantu language of Gabon.

References

Sira languages